Red Love (Italian: Amore rosso)  is a 1952 Italian crime melodrama film directed by Aldo Vergano and starring Marina Berti, Massimo Serato and Guido Celano. It was shot at the Cinecittà Studios in Rome. The film's sets were designed by the art director Alberto Boccianti. It is an adaptation of the 1915 Sardinian-set novel Marianna Sirca by Grazia Deledda and is sometimes also known by this title. Location shooting took place around Aggius and Tempio in Gallura rather than the Nuoro setting of the novel. It was not a commercial success on its first release.

Cast 
 Marina Berti	as	Marianna Sirca
 Massimo Serato	as	Simone Sole
 Guido Celano	as	Fera
 Arnoldo Foà	as	Sebastiano
 Marcella Rovena	as	Fudera
 	as	Papà Berto
 Mario Terribile	as	Padre Perlo

References

Bibliography
 Goble, Alan. The Complete Index to Literary Sources in Film. Walter de Gruyter, 1999.
 Urban, Maria Bonaria. Sardinia on Screen: The Construction of the Sardinian Character in Italian Cinema. Rodopi,  2013.

External links
 

1952 films
1950s Italian-language films
Films based on works by Grazia Deledda
Films directed by Aldo Vergano
Italian crime drama films
1952 crime drama films
Italian black-and-white films
1950s Italian films
Films based on Italian novels
Films shot at Cinecittà Studios
Films shot in Sardinia
Films set in Sardinia